Tilottama is a 1951 Indian swashbuckling adventure fantasy film, produced and directed by Raja Saheb of Mirzapur under the Sobhanachala Pictures banner. It stars Akkineni Nageswara Rao and Anjali Devi, with music composed by P. Adinarayana Rao. The film was simultaneously shot in Telugu and Tamil, with the latter being titled Mayamalai. Tilottama was a box-office disaster.

Plot
This plot is about the Telugu version.The film begins with Deva Datta (Akkineni Nageswara Rao), son of a garland maker Haridas (M. C. Raghavan) who falls for a court dancer Vasantha Sena (Suryaprabha). Once, while Deva Datta is asleep a heavenly angel Tilottama (Anjali Devi), entices and lifts him together. Chandrakanth (Sadasiva Rao), wants to possess Tilottama aware of it. So, she backs Deva Datta by associating with another Tilottama (again Anjali Devi), daughter of King Soorasena (Sundara Rao). Also accords him a ring with which he can meet her. 

Tilottama on earth also loves and marries Deva Datta without her parents' knowledge and she conceives. One night when Deva Dattudu thinks of the heavenly Tilottama, he puts the ring on and reaches her. Chandrakanth observes them, in anger curses them to live as hunters on earth and be also oblivious to their past. On one side, Haridas and Vasantha Sena are in search of Deva Datta and on another side, Tilottama on earth feels sorrow that knows no bounds. So, her father prepares the picture of Deva Datta and announces rewards to those who would be able to get him. 

Ganapathi (M. Kondayya), Deva Datta's friend, sees the picture and writes a letter to Vasantha Sena to come to Tilottama's kingdom. As a musician, Vasantha Sena gains admission to the court. Vijaya Simha (A. V. Subba Rao), chief commander of the kingdom is attracted to Vasantha Sena, but she rejects him; in anger, he orders his men to kidnap her. But by mistake, they kidnap princess Tilottama and leave her in the forest, where she gives birth to a baby boy. Unfortunately, Haridas gives her shelter. As hunters, Deva Datta and heavenly Tilottama are getting on happily. Vasantha Sena is suspected of the missing princess Tilottama. She was given a death sentence. The soldiers take her to the forest, where Deva Datta protects her, but due to the curse, he is not able to recognize her, so he pushes her and runs away.

Meanwhile, heavenly Tilottama is banned from taking part in religious functions because she is childless. In distress, she consults a sorceress who suggests she offer a child to Goddess Kaali for children. Tilottama prevails on her husband to get a baby. Deva Datta kidnaps none other than princess Tilottama's child. Seeing this, she also runs behind him, Vasantha Sena and Haridas also follow them. All of them reach the temple, they try to stop from killing the baby but are goaded to it by Deva Datta. But to the prayers of princess Tilotamma, the Goddess Kali (Saroja) appears and gives back the child and also makes Deva Datta and heavily Tilottama into their former selves. Finally, the movie ends on a happy note with the Goddess blessing them all.

Cast

 Telugu version

Akkineni Nageswara Rao as Deva Dattudu
Anjali Devi as Tilottama
A. V. Subba Rao as Vijaya Simha
M. C. Raghavan as Haridasu
Sadasiva Rao as Chandrakanth
M. Kondayya as Ganapathi
K. V. Subba Rao as Setty
Sundara Rao as Soorasena
Ram Murthy as Venkatesam
Aadi Seshayya as Mantri
Babji as Lambu
Eemaan as Jambu
Kishan as Pingalla
P. M. Naidu as Adhikaari
Suryaprabha as Vasantha Sena
Vijayalakshmi as Chaarulata
Kanaakam as Maalathi
Vaanilakshmi as Manjari
Gangaratnam as Setty's wife
Chitti as Hema
Shanta as Sarala
Pushpalata as Vakula
Saroja as Goddess Kali

 Tamil version
List adapted from the database of Film News Anandan.

Male cast
A. Nageswara Rao
M. V. Mani
C. S. D. Singh
Sayeeram

Female cast
Anjali Devi
Menaka
Suryaprabha
Kanagam

Soundtrack

Music was composed by P. Adinarayana Rao. Lyrics were written by Tapi Dharma Rao. Music was released on Audio Company. 
 Telugu version

 Tamil version
The lyrics were penned by Papanasam Sivan, Rajagopala Iyer and Narasimhan. Playback singers are M. L. Vasanthakumari, P. Leela and Jikki.

References

Indian epic films
Indian fantasy films
Films based on Indian folklore
Films scored by Ghantasala (musician)
Indian multilingual films
Indian black-and-white films
1950s Tamil-language films
1950s fantasy films
1950s multilingual films